Blessid Union of Souls: The Singles is Blessid Union of Souls' greatest hits album. It was released in 2001. The compilation contains two original songs - "...And Then She Hit Me" and "Storybook Life". "Hey, Leonardo" comes from a 1999 live recording at KQKQ Omaha's "Sweetstock" festival,  while "I Believe" is performed in a reggae-punk style.

Track listing
 "Hey Leonardo (She Likes Me for Me)" — 3:27
 "...And Then She Hit Me" — 3:58
 "Storybook Life" — 2:52
 "That's the Girl I've Been Telling You About" — 3:39
 "I Believe" (Punky Irie Mix) — 2:57
 "Standing at the Edge of the Earth" — 4:18
 "Brother My Brother" — 3:44
 "Light in Your Eyes" — 4:16
 "Let Me Be the One" — 4:38
 "Oh Virginia" — 3:59
 "I Wanna Be There" — 4:30
 "All Along" — 3:54
 "Hey Leonardo (She Likes Me for Me)" (live version) — 3:58
 "I Believe" — 4:27
 "Rev It Up (NASCAR Rocks)" — 2:55

The CD was also released in Indonesia under the title Storybook Life.

References

External links
 Website info

2001 greatest hits albums
Blessid Union of Souls albums